Javier Moscoso del Prado y Muñoz (born 7 October 1934) is a Spanish politician who served as Minister of the Presidency from December 1982 to July 1986 and as Attorney General of the State from September 1986 to January 1990.

References

1934 births
Living people
University of Zaragoza alumni
Government ministers of Spain
20th-century Spanish politicians
Attorneys general of Spain